Florin George Călian is a Romanian historian of religion and philosophy. He is a researcher at the Institute for Ecumenical Research, Lucian Blaga University.

Educational background 
Florin George Călian studied psychology, philosophy and classical languages in Bucharest. He had a MA degree in Archeology and Greek-Roman History from Bucharest University, and another MA in Medieval Studies from Central European University. He obtained his doctoral degree from Central European University, with a dissertation on Plato's ontology of numbers, under the supervision of Gabor Betegh.

Professional background 
Călian had several research stays at the Departement für Philosophie of Université Fribourg (Switzerland), Trinity College (University of Oxford), Plato Center (Trinity College Dublin), Tübinger Stift (Eberhard Karls Universität Tübingen), New Europe College (Bucharest), Robarts Library (Toronto), Department of Incunabula, Old and Precious Books, Österreichische Nationalbibliothek (Wien). Together with the philologist Antoaneta Sabău, Florin Călian founded a school for classical and oriental languages: Dan Slușanschi School for Classical and Oriental Languages, which is under the administrative stewardship of the Lucian Blaga University of Sibiu. The main languages promoted by the school are: Spoken Latin, Ancient Greek, Sahidic Coptic, Biblical Hebrew and Old Slavonic. He published and lectured about platonic and neoplatonic philosophy, classical philology, religious studies, sacred spaces, etc. Călian is member of the editorial board of SCHOLÉ. Independent Journal of Philosophy and Review of Ecumenical Studies. As jurnalist he published în Neue Zürcher Zeitung, The Armenian Weekly, Capital Cultural, etc.

Interviews 

Nicht jeder Spezialist ist auch ein Intellektueller, Forscher Florin George Călian erzählt von Antoaneta Sabău, der Antike und Dan Slușanschi

Philosophy Today (with Florin Călian)
Studying classical philology (with Antoaneta Sabău și Florin Călian)

See also 
 Dan Slușanschi
 Antoaneta Sabău
 Central European University
 Lucian Blaga University of Sibiu

References

Central European University alumni
University of Bucharest alumni
Living people
20th-century translators
Philosophy academics
Romanian essayists
Romanian philosophers
Romanian writers
People from Sibiu
1978 births